Oxalic anhydride or ethanedioic anhydride, also called oxiranedione, is a hypothetical organic compound, one of several isomers having the formula C2O3 that have been studied computationally. It can be viewed as the anhydride of oxalic acid or the two-fold ketone of ethylene oxide. It is an oxide of carbon (an oxocarbon).

The simple compound apparently has yet to be observed (as of 2009). In 1998, however, Paolo Strazzolini and others have claimed the synthesis of dioxane tetraketone (C4O6), which can be viewed as the cyclic dimer of oxalic anhydride.

It has been conjectured to be a fleeting intermediate in the thermal decomposition of certain oxalates and certain chemoluminescent reactions of oxalyl chloride.

See also
1,2-dioxetanedione
α-acetolactone

References

External links

Carboxylic anhydrides
Hypothetical chemical compounds
Oxocarbons
Lactones
Conjugated ketones